A mabkhara ( or ) is a censer found across the Arab World and Turkey. The mabkhara was traditionally made from clay or soft stone. Most mabkharas (or mabakhir, the Arabic plural) have a square pedestal base with inward sloping sides which support a square cup with outward sloping sides. The wooden base is often carved out to form legs. The cup itself is lined with sheet metal. Older burners were decorated with patterned combinations of soft metal pegs and brass tacks, often with mirrors in the panels of the upper part. The legs were ordinarily covered with sheet metal.

More modern variations of the mabkhara are made of shiny plated sheet metal. While they retain the traditional shape, they tend to be decorated with mirrors, colored metals and come in many sizes, varying from a few inches to a few feet in height. The craft of making mabakharas is practiced today primarily by artisans, one of which living in Ha'il Province, one of the northern provinces of the Kingdom of Saudi Arabia.

Architectural mabkharas

The mabkhara has inspired architects to create buildings in the shape of a traditional mabkhara. For example, there is a mabkhara sculpture surrounded by coffee pots that stands in a square in Jeddah. Architects, sculptors and artists have included mabkharas as decorative landscape elements. In Riyadh and Jeddah there are large sculptures in the shape of mabkharas in public areas. Bronze mabkharas ornament the public gardens surrounding the water tower in Riyadh, and a large granite mabkhara stands in the Hamra section of Jeddah.

See also
 Bukhoor
 Dabqaad

Arabian Peninsula
Middle East
Emirati culture
Saudi Arabian culture
Arabic words and phrases
Arab inventions
Incense equipment